Braunsapis flaviventris is a species of bee belonging to the family Apidae subfamily Xylocopinae.

References

External links
 http://animaldiversity.org/accounts/Braunsapis_flaviventris/classification/
 https://www.itis.gov/servlet/SingleRpt/SingleRpt?search_topic=TSN&search_value=765038
 https://www.academia.edu/7390502/AN_UPDATED_CHECKLIST_OF_BEES_OF_SRI_LANKA_WITH_NEW_RECORDS

Xylocopinae
Insects of Sri Lanka
Insects described in 1991